The Air Force Falcons football program represents the United States Air Force Academy in college football at the NCAA Division I Football Bowl Subdivision (formerly Division I-A) level. Air Force has been a member of the Mountain West Conference since its founding in 1999. The Falcons play their home games at Falcon Stadium in Colorado Springs, Colorado. Troy Calhoun has been the team's head coach since 2007.

The three major service academies—Air Force, Army and Navy—compete for the Commander-in-Chief's Trophy which is awarded to the academy that defeats the others in football that year (or retained by the previous year's winner in the event of a three–way tie).

History

The Falcons are not only recognized by the lightning bolt on the side of their helmets, but their traditional option attack.  Air Force is one of the premier rushing teams in the nation.  Since Fisher DeBerry took over as Falcons head coach in 1984, they have ranked among the nation's top 10 in rushing 19 times in 21 years. The Air Force football team has enjoyed success not only on the field but also in the classroom. In 49 years of Air Force football, there have been 39 Academic All-Americans.

The 1985 season

1985 was the most successful season in Air Force football history. Under 5th-year coach Fisher DeBerry, the Falcons came within one win of playing for the national championship. They recorded 10 straight wins to start the season, climbed the polls to No. 2 in the nation, but lost to BYU 28–21 in the penultimate game of the regular season. Air Force rebounded with a bowl game win over Texas in the Bluebonnet Bowl and finished with a 12–1 record as the No. 5 ranked team in the nation.

Conference affiliations
Air Force has been affiliated with the following conferences.
 Independent (1955–1979)
 Western Athletic Conference (1980–1998)
 Mountain West Conference (1999–present)

Championships

Conference championships

† Co-champions

Division championships

Conference Championship Game appearances
Air Force has appeared in 2 conference championship games in their history, winning 1 of them.

Note: Includes appearances where the conference did not use divisions to determine championship game participants.

Bowl games

Air Force has played in 29 bowl games in their history, with a  record. Their highest finish in the polls was fifth (UPI coaches) in 1985.

Head coaches

In over 60 years of play in college football, the Falcons have had seven head coaches.

Top 25 finishes
The Air Force Falcons have finished in the AP Poll and/or the Coaches Poll 8 times in the program's history, with the highest-ranked finishes being No. 6 in 1958 and No. 8 in 1985.  Note: The AP Poll began in 1936, and the Coaches' Poll began in 1950. Before 1990, only the top 20 teams were ranked in the AP Poll before it was expanded to 25.

In addition to the major polls, the BCS produced rankings from 1998 to 2013 which helped select teams for the BCS Bowls. Then, starting in 2014, the CFP committee began issuing rankings to determine which teams were selected for the playoffs.

Falcon Stadium
Pre-game activities include flyovers by USAF aircraft, including the F-15 and B-2. Opened in 1962, its highest attendance was 56,409 in 2002, when the Falcons hosted Notre Dame.

Players

Individual accomplishments

Notable individual records
 Beau Morgan: He became the first player in NCAA history to rush and pass for over 1,000 yards in a season twice. He broke the NCAA single season rushing record for a quarterback, along with being only the second player in NCAA history to run and pass for 3,000 yards in a career.

Alumni in the National Football League

 Sid Abramowitz
 Shane Bonham
 Larry Cole
 Austin Cutting
 Bryce Fisher 
 Ben Garland
 Ron George
 Chris Gizzi 
 Garrett Griffin
 Chad Hall 
 Chad Hennings 
 Ernie Jennings
 Bill Line
 Beau Morgan 
 Steve Russ
 Anthony Schlegel
 Jeff Smith
 Ted Sundquist
 Mark Simon

All-Americans

Academic All–Americans

Academic All–Americans at Air Force.

Future non-conference opponents
Announced schedules as of January 9, 2022.

Rivals

Commander-in-Chief's Trophy
Air Force has a traditional rivalry against the other two FBS service academies, Army and Navy; the three play for the right to hold the Commander-in-Chief's Trophy.  Air Force has won the trophy 20 times, more than either Army or Navy.  
 Commander in Chief's Trophy Winners (AF-Army-Navy): 1982, 1983, 1985, 1987, 1989–1992, 1994, 1995, 1997–2002, 2010, 2011, 2014, 2016, 2022.

Colorado State
Air Force has played more games against Colorado State and Wyoming than any other school, having played each school 59 times since 1957, the Falcons' first season.

Since 1980, the Falcons and Colorado State Rams have competed for the Ram–Falcon Trophy. Air Force holds a 26–15 advantage over Colorado State in games that the trophy has been contested in.

Colorado
In 2019 Air Force renewed a rivalry with Colorado, winning at Folsom Field on Sept. 14 by a score of 30–23. The teams had not played since Oct. 5, 1974, a game that Colorado won by a score of 28–27. Air Force won the first meeting between the teams in 1958. The 1963 game between the two college football teams was postponed due to the assassination of President John F. Kennedy. The 1973 game, the last one played in Boulder before the 2019 clash, was marred by a riot. Fans threw eggs and beer at Air Force personnel and cadets.

Top 10 rivals
Below are Air Force's records against its top ten most-played opponents since 1957.

References

External links

 

 
1955 establishments in Colorado
American football teams established in 1955